The 1903 North Dakota Agricultural Aggies football team was an American football team that represented North Dakota Agricultural College (now known as North Dakota State University) as an independent during the 1903 college football season. In its second and final season under head coach Eddie Cochems, the team compiled a 5–1 record and outscored opponents by a total of 331 to 49.

The season was part of a three-year, 17-game winning streak that began on November 19, 1900, and ended on November 21, 1903.

Schedule

References

North Dakota Agricultural
North Dakota State Bison football seasons
North Dakota Agricultural Aggies football